is a professional wrestling promotion that operated in Japan until 2004 and in Mexico, where it's called Toryumon Mexico. The promotion is owned and operated by Yoshihiro Asai, who is best known under the name Último Dragón. Tōryūmon is a coined word that means Fighting Dragon Gate. The word is coined after the homonym  that literally means climbing up dragon gate and means gateway to success. The promotion was originally created to give graduates of the Último Dragón Gym a promotion to gain their initial in-ring experience in, it developed a major following and grew into becoming one of the hottest independent promotions in the country. The promotion would run for five years. On July 4, 2004, Último Dragón left the promotion and took the name and trademarks with him. The wrestlers and officials decided to adopt the name Dragon Gate and continue in the traditions of Toryumon. Since then Último Dragón has promoted Toryumon mainly in Mexico but also holds occasional shows in Japan.

History
During his time working for World Championship Wrestling (WCW) in the United States Japanese wrestler Último Dragón decided to open up a wrestling school in Naucalpan, Mexico to give Japanese hopefuls the chance to learn the Mexican lucha libre style like Dragón had. The wrestling school operated after the same principles of a university, divided into classes with several terms where wrestlers would "graduate" (debut) at the same time. The Ultimo Dragon Gym's first graduating term consisted of Cima, Don Fujii, Dragon Kid, Magnum Tokyo and Suwa who collectively became known as Toryumon Japan (a name that would be used for the first four terms). Toryumon promoted their first show on May 11, 1997, in Naucalpan, Mexico on a show that was co-promoted with International Wrestling Revolution Group (IWRG). Toryumon and IWRG would co-promote shows in Japan from 1997 until 2001, allowing the Ultimo Dragon Gym graduates to work on IWRG shows and even saw several graduates wrestlers win IWRG Championship. Through his contacts with WCW Último Dragón also arranged for some of his first term graduates to wrestle on World Championship Wrestling shows. On January 1, 1999, Toryumon held its first show in Japan and from that point forward began promoting regular shows in Japan. Toryumon's combination of traditional Japanese Puroresu, Mexican Lucha Libre and elements of Sports Entertainment that Último Dragón had observed while working for WCW such as outside interference and referee's being knocked out, something that at the time was not traditionally used in Japanese wrestling. The second class of Último Dragón Gym graduates began their own promotion, called the Toryumon 2000 Project, or T2P for short. The T2P promotion debuted on November 13, 2001, and became known for their use of the six-sided wrestling ring, the first promotion to regularly use such a ring shape. T2P wrestlers primarily used a submission based style called Llave (Spanish for "Key" the lucha libre term for submission locks). T2P ran until January 27, 2003, when the roster was absorbed into Toryumon. The third graduating class was known as "Toryumon X" and like T2P also started their own promotion under their class name. Toryumon X made its debut on August 22, 2003, and lasted until early 2004.

Último Dragón had been forced to retire from active competition in 1998 after a mistake during an elbow surgery that caused nerve damage. In 2001 Dragón had another round of surgery on his elbow, restoring mobility and feeling. Following his rehabilitation Último Dragón made his return to active wrestling on a Toryumon / T2P co-promoted pay-per-view on September 8, 2002. In the following months Dragón wrestled regularly for Toryumon and various companies around the world. Because of his active scheduled Último Dragón stepped down as the director of Toryumon leaving the job to Takashi Okamura. Okamura handled the job while Dragón began working full-time for World Wrestling Entertainment (WWE) in the United States. After his run with WWE ended Dragón returned to Japan and announced that he was leaving Toryumon and taking all the trademarks he owned with him. Toryumon Japan changed its name to Dragon Gate as a result of this, continuing the traditions of Toryumon Japan including references to Último Dragón. Since the break Toryumon has primarily promoted shows in Mexico, featuring students trained by Dragón and Jorge "Skayde" Rivera and a number of wrestlers from various Mexican and American promotions.

In Japan a group of remaining Toryumon students, including ousted members of Dragon Gate, joined with the internet-firm Livedoor to create the promotion dragondoor, a promotion that only ran six shows. The group launched another wrestling venture in 2006 called El Dorado: Next Door Project.

Shows and events
Toryumon Japan ran a series of PPVs under the names Vamonos Amigos ("Let's go friends" in Spanish) and "Revolucion" ("Revolution") as well as an annual anniversary show. They also held an annual Numero Uno League that became one of the highlights of the promotional year. Since the split in 2004 Toryumon has not promoted any major shows or PPVs, focusing their promotional efforts on Toryumon Mexico. In Mexico Dragón promotes an annual DragonMania show, with the last being DragonMania XI held on May 28, 2016.
In August 2017 Toryumon Mexico started working with All Japan Pro Wrestling in with a collaborated event tour called Lucha Fiesta.

Championships promoted
Before the Dragon Gate split in 2004 Toryumon Japan promoted a series of championships, only one of which originated in the promotion, Último Dragón Gym Championship, the rest were either bought from its previous owner or acquired after promotions closed. When the promotion turned to Dragon Gate all its championships were vacated, leaving only the Toryumon Mexico promoted titles.

Annual tournaments

Suzuki Cup
Suzuki Cup is a Team Tournament that began in 2007

2007: Marco Corleone, Kensuke Sasaki and Ultimo Dragon
2008: Alex Koslov, Marco Corleone and Ultimo Dragon

Young Dragons Cup
Every year Toryumon Mexico holds the Young Dragons Cup, an annual tournament that began in 1997. The tournament is used to showcase Dragon Gym students. Originally it was a traditional single-elimination tournament, in 2006 it was changed into a torneo cibernetico and has had that format ever since. Rocky Romero, Kota Ibushi, Ryuji Yamaguchi and Trauma II are the only tournament winners who were not actually trained by Último Dragón.

1997: Magnum Tokyo
1998: Genki Horiguchi
1999: Yasushi Kanda
2000: Milano Collection AT
2001: Toru Owashi
2002: Taiji Ishimori
2003: Takeshi Minamino
2004: Rocky Romero
2005: Kazuchika Okada
2006: Kota Ibushi
2007: Ryuji Yamaguchi
2008: Satoshi Kajiwara
2009: Trauma II
2010: Angélico

Yamaha Cup
Toryumon Mexico holds the Yamaha Cup about once a year, although there have been years without a Cup. The Yamaha Cup is a tag team tournament that features a mixture of Último Dragón trainees and a combination of wrestlers from the Mexican Independent circuit, IWRG and Consejo Mundial de Lucha Libre (CMLL).
2000: Susumu Mochizuki and Yasushi Kanda
2003: Taiji Ishimori and Shu Sato
2004: Mini Cima and SUWAcito
2005: Hiromi Horiguchi and Ryusuke Taguchi
2006: Johnny Stamboli and Chuck Palumbo
2008: Último Dragón and Yutaka Yoshie
2010: Angélico and El Hijo del Fantasma
2012: Angélico and Último Dragón

Ultimo Dragon Gym students

See also

List of professional wrestling promotions in Mexico
Universal Lucha Libre
Michinoku Pro Wrestling
WAR

References

External links
Toryumon/Dragon Gate Title Histories

Japanese professional wrestling promotions
Mexican professional wrestling promotions
Professional wrestling schools
Japan–Mexico relations
Toryumon